This is a list of the European Hot 100 Singles and European Top 100 Albums number ones of 1988, as published by Music & Media magazine.

Chart history

References

Europe
1988
1988